Australian Injecting and Illicit Drug Users League (AIVL) is the national peak organisation representing Australian drug user organisations and the issues of current and former illicit drug users. Annie Madden is AIVL's chief executive. AIVL is located in Canberra.

See also
 Supervised injection site

References

External links 
Official Homepage

Drugs in Australia